Shreve, also known as Rat, is an unincorporated community in Conecuh County, Alabama, United States.

History
Shreve is most likely named after a local family.

A post office operated under the name Shreve from 1901 to 1933.

References

Unincorporated communities in Conecuh County, Alabama
Unincorporated communities in Alabama